Regional elections were held in Denmark in 1901. Six municipal council members were elected for Copenhagen's municipal council.

References

1901
Denmark
Elections